Ali Hajipour is an Iranian taekwondo athlete who won the silver medal for Iran at the Asian Games 1986.

References
http://www.geocities.com/armtkd/asia.htm (Archived 2009-10-25)

Iranian male taekwondo practitioners
Living people
Asian Games silver medalists for Iran
Asian Games medalists in taekwondo
Taekwondo practitioners at the 1986 Asian Games
Medalists at the 1986 Asian Games
Year of birth missing (living people)
People from Urmia
20th-century Iranian people